Oliver Martin Kraas (born 18 April 1975 in Germiston) is a South African cross-country skier who has competed since 2003.  Competing in two Winter Olympics, he earned his best finish of 57th in the individual sprint event at Turin in 2006.

Kraas' best finish at the FIS Nordic World Ski Championships was 23rd in the team sprint at Oberstdorf in 2005.

His best World Cup finish was 38th in an individual sprint event at Germany in 2006.

References

1975 births
Living people
South African male cross-country skiers
Cross-country skiers at the 2006 Winter Olympics
Cross-country skiers at the 2010 Winter Olympics
Olympic cross-country skiers of South Africa